Boo of the Booless is the debut album of Nigerian singer Chike. It was released on February 14, 2020. Chike enlisted Ogaga Sakpaide to A&R the album.

Background 
The album is 14-tracked and has a total listening time of 46 minutes. It includes folk, R&B, afro-pop, alternative pop and highlife tracks. Chike enlisted producers including Deeyaso, Vtekk, Doron Clinton, Adejames Crack, Blaisemix, Bierdman and Nevmix. It features three artistes; Ric Hassani on "Nakupenda", M.I. Abaga on "Forever" and Zoro on "Watching Over Me".

Singles 
"Beautiful People" was released in 2018. It is described as an alternative song from the depths of Ireland.

"Finders Keepers" is a merger of alternative rock riffs with African guitar chords. Chike performed a fast-paced version of this song at his album listening party on February 16, 2020.

"Forever" features MI Abaga and is comparable to mid-2000s American R&B both in sound and lyrical delivery. Motolani Alake of Pulse Nigeria describes "Amen" as "wedding music in power, essence and construction".

Other releases 
Chike released a six-track mixtape named Dance of the Booless Volume 1 as a sequel to Boo of the Booless. It was described as a hybrid of Electronic Dance Music (EDM) and experimental Afro-Pop/RnB and contained remixes of songs from Boo of the Booless.

He released visuals for "Nakupenda" (featuring Ric Hassani). The video tells a love story using colourful aesthetics and a dramatic storyline. It portrays Chike as a rich client, who competes with a photographer for the love of a female model. It was directed by Ani James and Aje Film Works.

Reception 
It was listed as a top Nigerian album of the year 2020. It was rated 9.8/10 by Motolani Alake of Pulse Nigeria.  Chinonso Ihekire of The Guardian described it as "a brilliant debut that has become an instant classic" adding that it has one superpower: "its ability to make you re-listen over and over, eager to always hear melodies and lyrics that interflow like conjugated rivers of music."

Akindare Okunola of NET considered it the best R&B album since Simi's Omo Charlie Champagne and rated it an 8 out of 10.

It was nominated for Album of the Year at the 2020 Headies Awards. Chike was also nominated for the best vocal performance for "Forgive".

Track listing

Charts 
It charted at number 14 on MTV Base Naija hottest albums of 2020 chart.

References 

Highlife albums by Nigerian artists
Afro pop music albums
2020 albums
2020 in Nigeria